Kandidiana Ridge (‘Rid Kandidiana’ \'rid kan-di-di-'a-na\) is the partly ice-free ridge extending 6 km and 1.1 km wide, rising to 1176 m on the west side of Elgar Uplands in northern Alexander Island, Antarctica. It is crescent-shaped facing north-northwest, and surmounts Nichols Snowfield to the northwest, Delius Glacier to the northeast and Bartók Glacier to the south. The vicinity was visited on 30 January 1988 by the geological survey team of Christo Pimpirev and Borislav Kamenov (First Bulgarian Antarctic Expedition), and Philip Nell and Peter Marquis (British Antarctic Survey).

The feature is named after the ancient Roman fortress of Kandidiana in Northeastern Bulgaria.

Location

Maps
 British Antarctic Territory. Scale 1:200000 topographic map. DOS 610 – W 69 70. Tolworth, UK, 1971
 Antarctic Digital Database (ADD). Scale 1:250000 topographic map of Antarctica. Scientific Committee on Antarctic Research (SCAR). Since 1993, regularly upgraded and updated

Notes

References
 Bulgarian Antarctic Gazetteer. Antarctic Place-names Commission. (details in Bulgarian, basic data in English)
 Kandidiana Ridge. SCAR Composite Gazetteer of Antarctica

External links
 Kandidiana Ridge. Copernix satellite image

Ridges of Alexander Island
Bulgaria and the Antarctic